Pingleyuan Station is a station on Line 14 of the Beijing Subway. It was opened on December 30, 2017.

Station layout 
The station has an underground island platform.

Exits 
There are 3 exits, lettered B, C, and D. Exit B is accessible.

References

Railway stations in China opened in 2017
Beijing Subway stations in Chaoyang District